Misu Nomura (19 August 1896 – 15 March 1979) was a Japanese politician. She was one of the first group of women elected to the House of Representatives in 1946.

Biography
After graduating from Ueno Housekeeper High School in 1919 she worked as a primary school teacher. She married Kojiro Nomura, who worked at the tax office.

After World War II, Nomura contested the Niigata 2nd district in the 1946 general elections as an independent candidate, and was elected to the House of Representatives. After being elected she joined the National Cooperative Party. She unsuccessfully contested the 1947 House of Councillors elections as an NCP candidate in Niigata Prefecture. She died in 1979.

References

1896 births
Japanese schoolteachers
20th-century Japanese women politicians
20th-century Japanese politicians
Members of the House of Representatives (Japan)
National Cooperative Party politicians
1979 deaths